Siamon Gordon  (born 29 April 1938) is a British pathologist. He is Glaxo Wellcome Professor Emeritus of Cellular Pathology at the University of Oxford.

Education
He gained his medical degrees (M.B. and  Ch.B.) from the University of Cape Town, South Africa. He earned his PhD from Rockefeller University, where he taught from 1971 to 1976. The rest of his career, from 1976 to 2008, was at the University of Oxford.

Career and research
He was on the Faculty of 1000. He was a visiting scientist at the NIH. He is on the Scientific Advisory Board of the American Asthma Foundation.

Gordon is noted for his work on the phenotypic and functional diversity of macrophages. He began his studies on macrophages while in the laboratory of Zanvil Cohn at Rockefeller University in 1966. Upon his move to the Sir William Dunn School of Pathology at University of Oxford in 1976 he continued this work and identified the pan-macrophage marker F4/80. Subsequent studies led to the identification of various scavenger receptors and the cloning of the pattern recognition receptor, Dectin-1.

Publications
Macrophage Biology and Activation, Current Topics in Microbiology and Immunology (ed, 1992)
 Siamon Gordon (ed) The Legacy of cell fusion Oxford University Press, 1994, 
Advances in Cell and Molecular Biology of Membranes and Organelles (ed, 1999)
Siamon Gordon, ed (1999). Phagocytosis: the host 5. JAI Press,

References

British pathologists
Fellows of Exeter College, Oxford
Fellows of the Royal Society
Fellows of the Academy of Medical Sciences (United Kingdom)
Statutory Professors of the University of Oxford
University of Cape Town alumni
Rockefeller University alumni
Living people
1938 births